Rogers Brubaker (born 1956) is professor of sociology at University of California, Los Angeles and UCLA Foundation Chair. He has written academic works on social theory, immigration, citizenship, nationalism, ethnicity, religion, diasporas, gender, populism, and digital hyperconnectivity.

Born in Evanston, Illinois, Brubaker attended Harvard University and the University of Sussex before receiving a PhD from Columbia University in 1990.

Selected works
 (1984). The Limits of Rationality: An Essay on the Social and Moral thought of Max Weber, Taylor & Francis. 
 (1992). Citizenship and nationhood in France and Germany, Harvard University Press. 
 (1996). Nationalism reframed: nationhood and the national question in the New Europe, Cambridge University Press. 
 (2004). Ethnicity without groups, Harvard University Press. 
 (2006). Nationalist politics and everyday ethnicity in a Transylvanian town, Princeton University Press. 
 (2015). Grounds for difference, Harvard University Press. 
 (2016).  Trans: Gender and Race in an Age of Unsettled Identities. Princeton University Press.

References

External links
Faculty Profile, University of California-Los Angeles

American sociologists
Scholars of nationalism
Harvard College alumni
Alumni of the University of Sussex
Columbia University alumni
University of California, Los Angeles faculty
MacArthur Fellows
Living people
1956 births

Scholars of diaspora studies